Daphne Mary Cece Young married name Daphne Warrington (1915-1993) was an English international badminton player.

Badminton career
Young born in 1915  was a winner of the All England Open Badminton Championships. She won the 1938 All England Badminton Championships women's singles.
In addition she won the 1937 French Open, Welsh International and the Scottish Open and 1938 French Open and the Irish Open singles and doubles. Daphne broke a toe shortly before defending her All England title in 1939, and with her mobility restricted she lost to Dorothy Walton of Canada.

References

English female badminton players
1915 births
1993 deaths